Schönau Island is an island in Franz Josef Land, Russia.

Geography
This island lies off Koldewey Island's northern point in the Lavrov Sound opposite to Hall Island and Berghaus Island. It is only 90 m across.

Schönau Island Island is named after the town of Teplitz-Schönau (now Teplice, Czech Republic), the birthplace of Austro-Hungarian arctic explorer Julius Payer, who made the discovery of Franz Josef Land in the late 19th century when he led, as a Commander at Shore, the Austro-Hungarian North Pole Expedition together with Karl Weyprecht, who was Commander at Sea.

References

Islands of Franz Josef Land